Julius Jeremiah "Jimmie" Nufer (April 7, 1879 – June 25, 1949) was the fifth men's head basketball coach at Purdue University.

References

External links
 

1879 births
1949 deaths
Albion Britons football coaches
Purdue Boilermakers men's basketball coaches